68 Herculis is a triple star system located around 950 light-years away from the Sun in the northern constellation of Hercules. In the astronomical community it is often referred to by its Bayer designation of u Herculis, while 68 Herculis is the Flamsteed designation. The system is visible to the naked eye as a faint, blue-white-hued point of light with a peak apparent visual magnitude of 4.80. It is approaching the Earth with a heliocentric radial velocity of −17 km/s.

The inner pair of this system form a well-studied semidetached binary with the orbital plane oriented near the line of sight to the Earth, making it an Algol-type eclipsing binary. They have an orbital period of just over two days and a semimajor axis of 15 times the radius of the Sun, with the secondary component transferring mass to the hotter primary star. The main eclipse reduces the magnitude of the system to 5.37, while the second eclipse lowers the brightness to magnitude 4.93. Theoretical calculations suggest the donor star began with 7.2 times the mass of the Sun, the current primary at 3.6 solar masses, and their initial orbital period was around 1.35 days.

The primary, designated component Aa or sometimes just A, displays Beta Cephei-like pulsational behavior. It appears to be a B-type main-sequence star with a stellar classification of B2 V. The star has a high rate of spin, with a projected rotational velocity of 145 km/s. It has nearly eight times the mass of the Sun and five times the Sun's radius.

The secondary, component Ab or occasionally just B, has proven difficult to classify, but appears as a B-type star of type B8-9. It is close to triple the mass of the Sun with 4.3 times the Sun's radius. The star is spinning with a projected rotational velocity of 105 km/s. It is radiating 426.5 times the Sun's luminosity from its photosphere at an effective temperature of 12,600 K.

It shares a common proper motion and similar parallax to the eclipsing pair, and is modelled to be a main sequence star somewhat more massive, hotter, and more luminous than the Sun. Any orbit would require thousands of years.

References

External links

B-type main-sequence stars
Algol variables
Triple stars
Hercules (constellation)
Herculis, u
Durchmusterung objects
Herculis, 068
156633
084573
6431